"Colors of the Wind" is a song written by composer Alan Menken and lyricist Stephen Schwartz for Walt Disney Pictures' 33rd animated feature film, Pocahontas (1995). The film's theme song, "Colors of the Wind" was originally recorded by American singer and actress Judy Kuhn in her role as the singing voice of Pocahontas. A pop ballad, the song's lyrics are about animism and respecting nature, finding its roots in indigenous Native American culture,  perspectives which have later been adopted in both transcendentalist literature and New Age spirituality. 

"Colors of the Wind" received a mostly positive reception from critics, with several citing it as one of the best songs from a Disney film. The song would go on to win the Academy Award for Best Original Song, the Grammy Award for Best Song Written for a Motion Picture, Television or Other Visual Media, and the Golden Globe Award for Best Original Song. American actress and recording artist Vanessa Williams's adult contemporary cover of the song was released as the lead single on May 23, 1995, by Walt Disney Records, from the film's soundtrack, and became a top ten hit on the Billboard Hot 100. The song was also included on her third album, The Sweetest Days. "Colors of the Wind" would also be covered by other artists, including Ashanti and Brian Wilson, and was featured on an episode of Lip Sync Battle.

Background

Following the death of Howard Ashman, the Walt Disney Company wanted to find another musician to collaborate with Alan Menken on his scores for animated films. Stephen Schwartz, the composer behind the Broadway theater hits Godspell (1971), Pippin (1972), and The Magic Show (1974), received a call from the company asking if he would like to collaborate with Menken. Schwartz had never considered working in the film industry, but agreed to do so nonetheless.<ref>{{cite web| url=https://www.thestage.co.uk/features/interviews/2016/stephen-schwartz-i-had-no-idea-how-cut-throat-and-mean-theatre-was/| last=Shenton| first=Mark| title=Stephen Schwartz: I had no idea how cut-throat and mean theatre was'| publisher=The Stage| date=October 27, 2016|access-date=February 12, 2018}}</ref> Schwartz did not feel he was well-suited to the job.

Schwartz wanted to write a song for the film wherein Pocahontas confronts the Eurocentrism of John Smith. "Colors of the Wind" was the first song written for Pocahontas. According to Schwartz, the song "influence[d] the development of the rest of the film." Schwartz said that "a story-board outline was in place before we wrote [the track]. This is often the process in animation, at least as I've experienced it, where everybody works from an outline and each succeeding piece of material, whether it is a song or drawings, influences the next." The track was inspired by Native American poetry, music and folklore, as well as a now-debunked  letter that Schwartz believed was sent to the United States Congress by Chief Seattle regarding humanity's relationship with nature but was in fact a fabrication. Part of the letter reads: "The wind that gave our grandfather his first breath also received his last sigh. The wind also gives our children the spirit of life. So if we sell our land, you must keep it apart and sacred, as a place where man can go to taste the wind that is sweetened by the meadow flowers." This portion of the letter inspired the song's title, which Schwartz liked because he saw it as paradoxical and thought-provoking.

Schwartz also drew inspiration for "Colors of the Wind" from the music of Oscar Hammerstein II and Sheldon Harnick, as it deals with issues of prejudice. Menken said that while "Colors of the Wind" was "born out of the modality of Native American music...it quickly moved to its own place, which is hard to define." Menken has noted that the song lacks humor, which he and Schwartz attempted to inject into Pocahontas and failed. Initially, the final lines of the song were "For your life's an empty hull/till you get it through your skull/you can paint with all the colors of the wind." Menken disapproved of these lyrics and asked Schwartz to rewrite them; Schwartz changed the lines to "You can own the Earth, and still/all you'll own is earth until/you can paint with all the colors of the wind." Schwartz preferred the altered lyrics. Schwartz said that this incident taught him the lesson: "If your collaborator is unhappy, it's probably because [the song] needs to be better," adding that he may not have won an Academy Award if he did not change the lyrics. Menken views "Colors of the Wind" as one of the most important songs he has written. Schwartz believed that the Walt Disney Company would reject "Colors of the Wind" for being philosophical and different from previous Disney songs. Judy Kuhn sang the song to help "pitch" Schwartz's score to Disney, and the studio embraced the track. Schwartz and Menken became friends, and later wrote music for the Disney films The Hunchback of Notre Dame (1996) and Enchanted (2007) together.

Composition and lyrics

"Colors of the Wind" is a pop ballad written by Alan Menken and Stephen Schwartz and performed by Judy Kuhn. It has a length of three minutes and thirty-four seconds. According to the Orlando Sentinel, the song does not resemble Native American music. Nonetheless, adding a twist of creative license, the sentiment of First Nation Peoples' relationship to the land and its animals, as well as the contrast between colonialist and indigenous mindsets, are strikingly well portrayed, considering the lyricist's non-indigenous background. The song is about animism and having respect for nature. It features lyrics about "painting with all the colors of the wind" and listening to "the voices of the mountains sing."

Madhurya Gajula of The Odyssey Online opined that the song's lyrics about nature's interconnectivity bears similarity to transcendentalism, specifically the philosophy of Henry David Thoreau; similarly, Justyna Fruzińska wrote in Emerson Goes to the Movies: Individualism in Walt Disney Company's Post-1989 Animated Films that the lyrics of "Colors of the Wind" are reminiscent of the writings of transcendentalist Ralph Waldo Emerson and New Age spirituality.  The staff of Billboard likened the lyrics of "Colors of the Wind" to a public service announcement about embracing diversity. Sonically, Rita Kempley of The Washington Post found "Colors of the Wind" akin to music from Busby Berkeley films and The Little Mermaid (1989).

The song also features a mention of a "blue corn moon"; there is no such thing according to Charisse. Responding to a fan inquiry, Schwartz admitted that he coined the phrase after reading a Native American love poem which read: "I will come to you in the moon of green corn"; Native Americans referred to months as "moons" and named them after events that happened seasonally, such as the sprouting of green corn. Schwartz disliked the phrase "green corn moon" due to the sound of the word "green" and because he felt it might evoke the urban legend that the Moon is made of green cheese. Instead, Schwartz used the phrase "blue corn moon" as it reminded him of both blue moons and blue corn tortillas. Schwartz thought that the phrase might evoke the Indigenous peoples of the Southeastern Woodlands rather than the Algonquian people depicted in Pocahontas, but was satisfied with it anyway.

 International versions 
The 10th anniversary edition DVD release of the movie features a multi-language clip reel presenting the song "Colors of the Wind" in 11 of the 28 versions originally released for the movie, with an introduction by director Mike Gabriel.

Reception

Dominick Suzanne-Mayer of Consequence of Sound praised the track for featuring "surprisingly cutting" lyrics, "pointed commentary on racism, and a dynamic, soulful performance from Judy Kuhn all in one place." Time Raisa Bruner deemed "Colors of the Wind" one of the "powerful, uplifting theme songs" from the Disney Renaissance and a "classic". Jordan Appugliesi of Mic ranked it the sixth best song from a Disney soundtrack, saying that it is "a poignant, memorable ballad" in the vein of "Reflection" from Mulan (1998). Rita Kempler of The Washington Post felt that the "stirring anthem" is the song from Pocahontas which "comes closest to a show-stopper." The staff of Billboard called the song "artistic" and "wistful" and ranked it the ninth best song of the Disney Renaissance. Writing for The Austin Chronicle, Hollis Chacona opined "Unlike so many film composers of late, Menken knows when to keep quiet and when to let loose his powerful score. That power soars through its centerpiece (and no doubt Oscar-bound) song, 'Colors of the Wind,' performed by Judy Kuhn."

Dorkys Ramos of Time Out said that the song and "When You Wish Upon a Star" from Pinocchio (1940) are "at the top of our list when it comes to songs we don't tire of hearing again and again."  Spin Andrew Unterberger criticized the track's "patronizing" portrayal of Native American beliefs, but said that "man...Judy Kuhn's voice soars, with those little trills and sweeping highs. It makes it much easier to get behind what's ultimately an agreeable message of environmental awareness and acceptance." Aylin Zafar of BuzzFeed ranked "Colors of the Wind" the ninth best Disney song, commending it for "encourag[ing] people to appreciate the world around them and to seek to understand others before judging them." Gregory E. Miller of the New York Post deemed it one of Disney's best songs and an "iconic hit" which is "flashier" than another song from Pocahontas, "Just Around the Riverbend". Screen Rant's Turner Minton viewed "Colors of the Wind" as the tenth best Disney song and "an anthem about the harmonious nature of the shared world which embraces all races of people."

Charles Solomon of the Los Angeles Times viewed "Colors of the Wind" and "When She Loved Me" from Toy Story 2 (1999) as the only Disney songs released since Howard Ashman's death which "approached the standards" of the music from Beauty and the Beast (1991) and Aladdin (1992). The staff of People said that the track is "performed effectively within the body of the film by Kuhn".  CollegeHumor's Willie Muse wrote that "even though Pocahontas as a whole is completely forgettable, I guarantee everyone reading this knows every single lyric of ["Colors of the Wind"]. Beautiful to listen to and epic in its scope, 'Colors of the Wind' transcends the movie that birthed it to earn its place as an undeniable classic."  Janet Maslin of The New York Times deemed the song "heartfelt" but less catchy than previous Disney songs. Owen Gleiberman of Entertainment Weekly stated that Pocahontas "Alan Menken-Stephen Schwartz songs have all the flavor of uncooked dough". Peter Travers of Rolling Stone criticized the song for its "political correctness" and for "sermoniz[ing] about ecology by using pedestrian conceits".
The track won the Academy Award for Best Original Song, the Golden Globe Award for Best Original Song, and the Grammy Award for Best Song Written for Visual Media.

Cover versions and usage in media
Vanessa Williams version

Background and composition
Vanessa Williams was chosen to perform "Colors of the Wind" due to the success of her Grammy Award-nominated single "Save the Best for Last". Williams' cover is an adult contemporary pop song which omits the opening lyrics of the original version of the track. The cover features Bill Miller playing the Native American flute. Scott Mendelson of Forbes wrote "The practice of having what amounts to a radio-friendly pop version of a given Disney song for a new Disney movie is of course an old tradition going back at least to" Celine Dion and Peabo Bryson's cover of the title track of Beauty and the Beast (1991); Mendelson noted that this practice was continued with Williams' version of "Colors of the Wind" and Demi Lovato's rendition of "Let It Go" from Frozen (2013). According to Mendelson, Williams' cover "was considered an 'all is forgiven' note" following the removal of her Miss America title. It was also included on Williams' re-released third album, The Sweetest Days.

On the Spanish version of the single included as B-side, Williams sings the song in Spanish with a strong English accent. The Spanish version of the song featured in the film was sung by Mexican singer and actress Susana Zabaleta.

Credits and personnel
 Vanessa Williams: lead vocals
 Alan Menken: composer
 Stephen Schwartz: lyricist
 Robbie Buchanan: arranger, keyboards
 Keith Thomas: producer, arranger, additional keyboards, synthesizers, drum programming, bass synth
 Mark Hammond: drum programming
 Jerry McPherson: guitars
 Bill Miller: flute
 Ronn Huff: orchestra arrangements
 The Nashville String Machine: orchestra

Critical reception
Raisa Bruner of Time said that Williams' rendition was "performed flawlessly", adding that "The powerful Pocahontas song finds the crystal-clear voice of Vanessa Williams painting a vision of 17th-century Native American life—and the importance of the environment—that still resonates with audiences today." Bruner said that the cover stood alongside Elton John's version of "Can You Feel the Love Tonight" from The Lion King (1994) as one of "the best radio-ready versions of Disney's finest melodies". MTV's Jessica Norton felt that the cover is "even more magical" than the original and "fitting...for free-spirited 'Nessa to cover." The staff of People opined that the song is "not well served by the former Miss America’s pop diva turn. Indeed, her overblown interpretation seems directly at odds with the song’s message. Stay tuned to Kuhn."

Other covers
The album Disneymania (2002) includes Ashanti's version of "Colors of the Wind". Actress Christy Carlson Romano covered the song for her debut EP Greatest Disney TV & Film Hits (2004). Actress and singer Vanessa Hudgens covered the song for Disneymania 5 (2007). Brian Wilson released a funk-influenced version of "Colors of the Wind" on his album In the Key of Disney (2011). American singer Tori Kelly's rendition of the song was included on the album We Love Disney (2015). Kelly decided to cover the song because she was obsessed with Pocahontas as a child. She also sang it for The Disney Family Singalong in 2020 due to the COVID awareness. The Chipettes covered the song for the 1995 album When You Wish Upon a Chipmunk.  Australian soprano Mirusia Louwerse covered "Colors of the Wind" for This Time Tomorrow (2016), her fourth solo album. The singer's arrangement has been described as featuring "a simple and unobtrusive accompaniment on acoustic guitar." Postmodern Jukebox, a musical collective that creates vintage-style covers of popular songs, released a cover of the song in the style of 1970s soul music.

Usage in media
Actress Melissa McCarthy lip synced the song during an episode of Lip Sync Battle''. Before lip syncing the track, McCarthy donned protective goggles. Then a high-powered wind machine blew water, stuffed animals, confetti, streamers and fake leaves at her as the song played. The performance received a standing ovation, and Jimmy Fallon deemed her the winner of the battle.

The song's opening and closing bars are used for the jingle of Steve Wright's Sunday Love Songs on BBC Radio 2.

Charts and certifications

Vanessa Williams version

Weekly charts

Year-end charts

Certifications

Judy Kuhn version

Certifications

References

Bibliography

External links
  (on Disney's official channel)

1995 songs
1995 singles
Songs from Pocahontas (1995 film)
Environmental songs
Best Original Song Golden Globe winning songs
Best Original Song Academy Award-winning songs
Grammy Award for Best Song Written for Visual Media
Walt Disney Records singles
Mercury Records singles
Pop ballads
Disney Renaissance songs
Songs with music by Alan Menken
Songs written by Stephen Schwartz (composer)
Vanessa Williams songs
1990s ballads
Songs against racism and xenophobia
Brian Wilson songs
Pam Tillis songs
Tori Kelly songs
Ashanti (singer) songs
Song recordings produced by Alan Menken
Indigenous peoples and the environment